Guz may refer to:

People 
 Guz (surname)
 Guz Khan (born 1986), English comedian

Other uses 
 Guz, a unit of length
 Gat railway station, in Pakistan
 Gusii language
 HMNB Devonport, a Royal Navy base

See also